Filipe Nzanza (born April 21, 1970) is a retired Angolan football player. He has played for Angola national team and for Clube Desportivo Primeiro de Agosto.

National team statistics

References

1970 births
Living people
Angolan footballers
Association football midfielders
Angola international footballers